Jamal Watson is a writer and columnist whose work is regularly featured in Diverse: Issues In Higher Education and The Root. In 2001, Watson reported that Harvard Law School Professor Charles Ogletree and attorney Johnnie Cochran were planning a lawsuit on behalf of the descendants of African slaves.

Watson has also written for a variety of other publications including the Washington City Paper, The Baltimore Sun and USA Today. He holds a teaching appointment in Communications at Trinity University.

As a critic, Watson is frequently a guest on WNYC radio, an affiliate of National Public Radio and has appeared on Fox News' Hannity and Colmes and Nightline. He is featured in Dick Morris' best-selling book, Condi vs. Hillary and has been quoted in a handful of other books and publications. He is completing a full-length biography of the Reverend Al Sharpton which was scheduled to be published in Fall 2021.

References

External links
 Jamal Watson's homepage

Living people
American columnists
Year of birth missing (living people)